The Violin Concerto No. 5 in A minor was composed by Niccolò Paganini in 1830. It is one of the most widely performed of Paganini's last four violin concertos. A typical performance lasts about 40 minutes. It is in fact the last concerto of Paganini (the concerto #6 was partly written in 1815.)

The concerto is in three movements:
Allegro maestoso (A minor)
Andante, un poco sostenuto (E minor – E major)
Finale - Rondo. Andantino quasi Allegretto (A minor)

Only the solo part of Paganini's Concerto No. 5 with a few annotations on the accompaniment is extant; the orchestral score either was not written down or has not yet been discovered. According to the manuscript, it was composed no earlier than the spring of 1830, but was not published in any form until 1976.

This concerto by the most famous of all violin virtuosi can be called a monologue for the violin. Because the solo part exists, the concerto can be performed if suitably reconstructed. There are three known reconstructions of the concerto.

Franco Gulli was the soloist and Luciano Rosada the conductor. The success of this performance induced Gulli to present the concerto in many European cities.

The first theme of the majestic first movement, a theme that generates from "Le Streghe" (Witches's Dance) and the beginning of the second are also found in Paganini's "Sonata Varsavia" (Warsaw Sonata). The Andante is perhaps musically the central section of the work. In the third movement the recurrent idea is an ingenious melody "alla campanella". According to his custom, Paganini omits the Trio in the finale, since the soloist is limited here to purely virtuoso passages, evidently the composer had intended that the orchestra should play the theme.

The first movement is in sonata form and alternates between A minor and A major, and starts with a very long orchestral introduction preceding the solo voice, reminiscent of Chopin's Piano Concerto No. 1. The tonal movement is characteristic to the Paganini's minor concerts: A minor - C major - D minor - A major, surprisingly returning to A minor 4 measures before the end of the first movement. The second movement is a slow and mournful andante, beginning in E minor and finishing in E major. The third a rondo, with the refrain in A minor and two episodes - primarily in C major, than in F major. The final sentence of the third movement contains the allusion to the famous Caprice #24. Most of the orchestration was not written by Paganini and was completed after his death.

Recordings
Massimo Quarta (soloist and conductor), Orchestra del Teatro Carlo Felice di Genova, recorded in 2000 (Dynamic CDS300: Paganini played on Paganini's violin, vol.2, released in 2002)
Salvatore Accardo (Violin), Charles Dutoit (Conductor). London Philharmonic Orchestra (Deutsche Grammophon 2530 961, recorded 1975)

References

5
1830 compositions
Compositions in A minor